Li Yu (born 16 March 1976) is a former Chinese short track speed skater who participated in the 1998, 2002, and 2006 Winter Olympics.

References

External links

Chinese male speed skaters
1976 births
Living people
Olympic speed skaters of China
Sportspeople from Qiqihar
Speed skaters at the 1998 Winter Olympics
Speed skaters at the 2002 Winter Olympics
Speed skaters at the 2006 Winter Olympics
Speed skaters at the 1999 Asian Winter Games
Speed skaters at the 2003 Asian Winter Games
20th-century Chinese people